Artémise was a 32-gun  frigate of the French Navy.

She was under construction in Toulon when the Coalition seized the city in August 1793. They evacuated the city in December 1793, leaving her behind. The French named her Aurore on 24 July 1794, but then renamed her Artémise when they launched her on 25 September.

Her captain was relieved of his command for leaving Minerve.

In 1798, she took part in the Expedition of Egypt. During the Battle of the Nile on 2 August 1798  and  engaged her; outgunned, her crew set fire to her to prevent the British from capturing her.

Citations

References
 
 
 

Magicienne-class frigates
Ships built in France
1794 ships
Frigates of the French Navy
Maritime incidents in 1798
Ship fires
Scuttled vessels
Shipwrecks of Egypt
Shipwrecks in the Mediterranean Sea